Ernest Skeete (4 June 1865 – 14 August 1939) was a Barbadian cricketer. He played in three first-class matches for the Barbados cricket team from 1883 to 1888.

See also
 List of Barbadian representative cricketers

References

External links
 

1865 births
1939 deaths
Barbadian cricketers
Barbados cricketers
People from Saint Philip, Barbados